Héctor Edgardo Novick Varela (born 22 November 1956 in Montevideo) is a Uruguayan businessman and politician.

Biography
Starting out as a street market worker with his father, Novick developed an important business career. Novick co-owns Nuevocentro Shopping.

In 2015 Novick was a candidate in the Municipal Elections.

On 7 November 2016 Novick founded a political party, Partido de la Gente.

Novick is father of accountant Bernardo, actress Lucía Victoria, and the footballers Marcel and Hernán Novick.

References

External links

1956 births
Living people
Uruguayan businesspeople
Uruguayan politicians
Politicians from Montevideo